Cheng Taining (born 9 December 1935) is a Chinese architect.

Biography
Cheng was born 9 December 1935 in Nanjing, Jiangsu, China. He graduated from the School of Architecture of Nanjing Institute of Technology (now part of Southeast University). In 1984 Cheng became director and chief architect of the Hangzhou Architectural Design Institute. He won the Liang Sicheng Architecture Prize in 2004 and was elected a member of Chinese Academy of Engineering in 2005. His pieces were collected in 20th-Century World Architecture by International Union of Architects.

Cheng has designed more than 40 large-scale projects, including the National Theatre of Ghana, the Hangzhou railway station, National Assembly Building of Mali, Shaoxing Citizens' Square, Shaoxing Lu Xun Museum, and Haining Museum.

References 

1935 births
Living people
Educators from Nanjing
Southeast University alumni
Members of the Chinese Academy of Engineering
Chinese architects
Academic staff of Southeast University
Engineers from Jiangsu